The 2014 Superbike World Championship was the twenty-seventh season of the Superbike World Championship.

The season saw the revision of the Superpole format: riders placed from eleventh to twentieth position in the combined classification of the first three practice sessions were admitted to Superpole 1, then the two fastest SP1 riders progressed to Superpole 2, which finally awarded the pole position, joining the ten fastest riders of practice.

Sylvain Guintoli became the Superbike World Champion at the last race, prevailing over Tom Sykes by six points in the standings. But both Marco Melandri and Tom Sykes won more races than Sylvain Guintoli this season. With Sykes winning 8 and Melandri 6 compared to Guintoli's 5. A portion of the riders was entered into the EVO class, featuring Superbike motorcycles with Superstock engines and electronics, scoring points for the World Championship standings and competing for the class title; David Salom was the EVO entry who amassed the most points in the overall championship standings and was awarded the title.

Race calendar and results
The Fédération Internationale de Motocyclisme released a 14-round provisional calendar on 29 November 2013. The event scheduled at the Moscow Raceway for 21 September 2014 was cancelled due to the Russian military intervention in Ukraine, while Qatar was included in the 13-round updated version of the calendar, issued by the FIM on 12 April 2014, as the venue of the last event of the season.

On 31 July 2014, the Qatar round was confirmed by the Fédération Internationale de Motocyclisme, and was to be held under floodlights for its return to the calendar. On the same date, it was announced that the South African round – due to be held on 19 October at Phakisa Freeway in Welkom – was cancelled due to delays in achieving the FIM homologation requirements. It was later announced that the round would not be replaced on the calendar, reducing the season to 12 rounds.

Entry list

All entries used Pirelli tyres.

Championship standings

Riders' championship

Manufacturers' championship

References

External links

 
Superbike World Championship seasons
World